Years to Burn is the second album by Calexico and Iron & Wine. The artists previously worked together on the EP In the Reins (2005).

Track listing

Personnel
Sam Beam – vocals, acoustic guitar (all tracks except 4)
Joey Burns – acoustic guitar, electric guitar
John Convertino – drums, vibes (track 4)
Paul Niehaus – pedal steel guitar (tracks 1, 2, 4, 6)
Bob Burger - piano, accordion, organ, vibes (tracks 3, 6), prepared piano, piano organ, vocals (track 6)
Sebastian Steinberg – electric bass, bowed upright bass (track 4), nylon string guitar (track 6), percussion, vocals (track 6)
Jacob Valenzuela – trumpet (tracks 1, 4, 6, 7), vocals (track 6)

Charts

References

2019 albums
Calexico (band) albums
Iron & Wine albums
Sub Pop albums
Collaborative albums
Albums produced by Matt Ross-Spang